The 1965 Buffalo Bills season was the team’s sixth season in the American Football League. Though not as statistically dominant as the previous season, the Bills won a second consecutive league championship.

Although Buffalo's offense was in the middle of the pack in 1965, it was their dominant team defense that kept them atop the league's standings. Buffalo gave up only 226 points (16.1 per game), fewest in the AFL, and one point fewer than AFL Championship runner-up San Diego. The Bills' opportunistic defense led the league in interceptions, with 32, and gave up a league-low four rushing touchdowns all season. Between week 6 of the 1964 season, through week eight of the 1965 season, including two 1964 playoff games, the Bills' defense did not allow a touchdown by rushing, a Professional Football record that still stands.

The Bills, who had led the AFL in points, rushing yards and total yards the previous season, suffered significantly after losing star running back Cookie Gilchrist in the offseason. Statistically, the Bills dropped to 6th (out of 8) in rushing yards, and 7th in passing yards. Still, they managed to finish 3rd in the AFL in points scored, with 313 (22.3 per game).

The Bills' turnover ratio was +18, best in the AFL, and fourth best in AFL history. Buffalo's +87 point differential was second-best in the league in 1965.

Seven Bills made the 1965 AFL All-Star team: safety George Saimes, cornerback Butch Byrd, linebacker Mike Stratton, defensive tackle Tom Sestak, guard Billy Shaw, kicker Pete Gogolak, and quarterback Jack Kemp.

Personnel

Coaches/Staff

Final roster

Offseason 
The Bills lost All-AFL running back Cookie Gilchrist to the Denver Broncos after the 1964 season. Bills running back Wray Carlton would take over as the Bills' lead back.

AFL Draft

Regular season

Standings

Season schedule 

Note: Intra-division opponents are in bold text.

Player stats

Passing

Rushing

Postseason

AFL Championship Game 

Buffalo Bills 23, San Diego Chargers 0
December 26, 1965, at Balboa Stadium, San Diego, CaliforniaAttendance: 30,361

Scoring
 BUF – Warlick 18 pass from Kemp (Gogolak kick)
 BUF – Byrd 74 punt return (Gogolak kick)
 BUF – Field goal Gogolak 11
 BUF – Field goal Gogolak 39
 BUF – Field goal Gogolak 32

AFL All-Star Game

Awards and Records 
 Lou Saban, Coach of the Year

References 

 Buffalo Bills on Pro Football Reference
 Buffalo Bills on jt-sw.com

Buffalo Bills
American Football League championship seasons
Buffalo Bills seasons
1965 in sports in New York (state)